DWNS-TV, channel 10, is a commercial television station owned by GMA Network Inc. Its transmitter is located at Upper Mabayuan, Olongapo.

GMA TV-10 Olongapo programs
One North Central Luzon (Formerly as Balitang Amianan) - flagship afternoon newscast in Filipino Language (simulcast on TV-10 Dagupan)
Mornings with GMA Regional TV - flagship morning newscast in Filipino Language simulcast on GMA TV-10 Dagupan

References

See also
 DZEA-TV
 DZBB-TV
 List of GMA Network stations

Television channels and stations established in 1984
GMA Network stations
Television stations in Olongapo